The Story of Dida Ibsen (German: Dida Ibsens Geschichte) is a 1918 German silent drama film directed by Richard Oswald and starring Anita Berber, Conrad Veidt and Werner Krauss. It is an adaptation of Margarete Böhme's 1907 novel of the same title, a sequel to her best-known work The Diary of a Lost Girl. It was one of a series of enlightenment films made by Oswald during the period.

Cast
 Anita Berber as Dida Ibsen 
 Conrad Veidt as Erik Norrensen  
 Werner Krauss as Philipp Galen  
 Emil Lind as Vater Ibsen  
 Clementine Plessner as Frau Ibsen 
 Ernst Pittschau as Eken Kornils 
 Eugen Rex as Lude Schnack 
 Ilse von Tasso-Lind as Dame  
 Maria Forescu as Dienerin  
 Loni Nest as Didas Tochter

References

Bibliography
 Prawer, S.S. Between Two Worlds: The Jewish Presence in German and Austrian Film, 1910-1933. Berghahn Books, 2005.
 Woodford, Charlotte & Schofield, Benedict. The German Bestseller in the Late Nineteenth Century. Camden House, 2012.

External links 
 

1918 films
Films of the Weimar Republic 
German drama films
German silent feature films
Films directed by Richard Oswald
1918 drama films
Films based on German novels
German black-and-white films
Silent drama films
1910s German films